Boomtown is the second studio album by American country music artist Toby Keith. It was released on September 27, 1994 by Mercury Records. The album produced four hit singles for Keith on the US Billboard Hot Country Songs chart between 1994 and 1995 with "Who's That Man" (#1), "Upstairs Downtown" (#10), "You Ain't Much Fun" (#2) and "Big Ol' Truck" (#15). The album was also certified platinum by the RIAA for U.S. sales of one million copies.

Track listing

Personnel
Michael Black - background vocals
Tom Flora - background vocals
Sonny Garrish - steel guitar, Dobro
Tim Gonzales - harmonica
Owen Hale - drums
Clayton Ivey - keyboards
Toby Keith - lead vocals
Gary Lunn - bass guitar
Danny Parks - electric guitar
Don Potter - acoustic guitar
Ron "Snake" Reynolds - percussion
Milton Sledge - drums
Russell Terrell - background vocals
Dennis Wilson - background vocals
Reggie Young - electric guitar

Charts

Weekly charts

Year-end charts

Notes

1994 albums
Toby Keith albums
Mercury Records albums
Albums produced by Harold Shedd